The FNRS-2 was the first bathyscaphe. It was created by Auguste Piccard. Work started in 1937 but was interrupted by World War II. The deep-diving submarine was finished in 1948. The bathyscaphe was named after the Belgian Fonds National de la Recherche Scientifique (FNRS), the funding organization for the venture. FNRS also funded the FNRS-1 which was a balloon that set a world altitude record, also built by Piccard. The FNRS-2 set world diving records, besting those of the bathyspheres, as no unwieldy cable was required for diving. It was in turn bested by a more refined version of itself, the bathyscaphe Trieste.

FNRS-2 was built from 1946 to 1948. It was damaged during sea trials in 1948, off the Cape Verde Islands. FNRS-2 was sold to the French Navy when FNRS funding ran low, in 1948. The French rebuilt and rebaptised it FNRS-3. It was eventually replaced by the FNRS-4.

Sea trials
FNRS-2 went for sea trials accompanied by the 3500 t Belgian ship Scaldis, as its tender. However, Scaldis crane was not strong enough to lift FNRS-2 while its float was filled, and this proved to be the detail that would end FNRS-2 career. Scaldis attempted to tow FNRS-2 back to port, but it was battered by ocean waves and sprang a gasoline leak. After the leak was detected, the gasoline was dumped into the sea and FNRS-2 was raised. However, there was no reserve of gasoline for replacement, nor funding to fix the float.

See also
 Trieste
 Trieste II
 Georges Houot

References

Bibliography
 Le Bathyscaphe, en collaboration avec Pierre Willm, Éditions de Paris, 1954
 La Découverte sous-marine, Éditions Bourrellier, 1959 
 20 ans de Bathyscaphe, Éditions Arthaud, 1972 
 Le bathyscaphe - à 4500 m. au fond de l'océan 
 Bathyscaphe le à 4050 m au fond de l'océan  
 2000 Fathoms Down

External links
 
 
 
 

Deep-submergence vehicles
Submarines of Belgium
Trieste-class deep-submergence vehicle